Christian Alliance Cheng Wing Gee College (abbreviated as CACWGC or CWGC) was established in 1984, the third to be affiliated with the Kowloon Tong Church of the Chinese  Christian and Missionary Alliance. It is a full-time aided co-educational secondary grammar school. It is located next to Tai Wai station.

Starting from 2016, subjects provided during fourth year include chemistry, physics, biology, geography, economics, information technology, BAFS, Chinese history, M2 and design and technology (DAT)

References

Protestant secondary schools in Hong Kong
Tai Wai
Christian and Missionary Alliance
Educational institutions established in 1984
1984 establishments in Hong Kong